Vincent Evans (1896–1976) was a Welsh artist who had a varied career as a painter, printmaker and art teacher and is known for his depictions of mine workers.

Biography
Evans was born in Ystalyfera in the Swansea Valley in South Wales. Evans was born into a large family of seven children and from the age of thirteen worked as a coal miner. In 1911 he began taking part-time classes at the Swansea School of Art and in 1912 some of his drawings were printed in the Cambria Daily Leader.
 
After ten years working in local pits, Evans attended Swansea School of Art. By 1919 Evans had had a picture exhibited at the Royal Academy and his painting Toilers Underground had been bought by the South Wales Miners' Federation for £60. In 1920 he won a scholarship to the Royal College of Art, RCA, where he studied under William Rothenstein and Frank Short until 1922.

After graduating from the RCA, Evans undertook a variety of commissions in Britain and overseas. Between 1924 and 1933, he worked as the Art Director at the Wanganui Technical College in New Zealand. This led to Evans representing that country in the art contest at the 1928 Olympics in Amsterdam. After he returned from New Zealand, Evans resumed painting scenes in the South Wales coalfields and throughout the 1930s produced a substantial body of work there. In 1936 he had two large pieces showing underground workers shown at the Royal Academy. In the mid-1930s he began work on his largest picture, A Welsh Family Idyll which he regarded as a statement of Welsh national values and a tribute to his home village.

During World War II, Evans had a number of works, depicting miners working underground, accepted by the War Artists' Advisory Committee. Before the War, in 1935,  Evans had also completed a similar commission for the South Wales branch of the Miners Federation. From 1940, he taught at Slough Grammar School and eventually became the art master there. Evans held that post until 1968 and then, after further time abroad, taught at Slough College until 1968. Evans also worked as chief examiner for the London University Examination Board and the Central Welsh Examination Board.

Evans was a fine portrait painter, was a member of the Royal Society of Portrait Painters and exhibited nineteen times at the Royal Academy, first showing there while still a student at the RCA and mostly showing mining subjects. He also exhibited at the New English Art Club, the Leicester Galleries and at the Paris Salon.

References

External links

 

1896 births
1976 deaths
20th-century Welsh male artists
20th-century Welsh painters
Alumni of the Royal College of Art
British war artists
Artists from Swansea
Welsh male painters
Welsh portrait painters
World War II artists